The 2000–01 season was the 100th season in Athletic Bilbao's history and their 70th consecutive season in La Liga, the top division of Spanish football.

Season summary

Athletic Bilbao began their centenary season with a new head coach following the departure of Frenchman Luis Fernández. Fernández had been in charge for four years, becoming Athletic's most successful coach for a generation by leading them to the runners-up spot in La Liga in 1997–98. To replace him, Bilbao legend Txetxu Rojo was tempted away from Real Zaragoza, who he had just guided to an exceptional 5th place in the league, six places higher than his new club. This would be Rojo's second spell at San Mamés, having previously led the team briefly during the 1989–90 season.

Rojo could not replicate his La Liga success with Athletic, as they slipped yet further to 12th place, their worst performance for five years. They fared little better in the Copa del Rey, being eliminated at the last 16 stage by Racing Santander.

Rojo departed at the end of the season, returning to Zaragoza, and was replaced by another returning former coach, German Jupp Heynckes, who had most recently been manager of Benfica in Portugal.

Squad statistics

Appearances and goals

|}

Results

La Liga

League table

See also
2000–01 La Liga
2000–01 Copa del Rey

External links

References

Athletic Bilbao
Athletic Bilbao seasons